Adrián Alexei Aldrete Rodríguez (born 14 June 1988) is a Mexican professional footballer who plays as a left-back for Liga MX club UNAM.

Club career

Morelia
Born in Guadalajara, Jalisco, Aldrete began his football career with Monarcas Morelia as a defender and midfielder. During his time as a player in Morelia, Mexico U-17 coach Jesús Ramírez spotted young Aldrete and gave him a spot in the Mexico team in the 2005 FIFA U-17 World Cup, which Mexico would win. After his participation in the World Cup, he was loaned to Dorados de Sinaloa for the Clausura 2006 season because he was not used in the first team and he needed to "gain experience".

After his six-month loan to Dorados, Aldrete returned to Morelia and made his first appearance on 5 August 2006 under coach Hugo Hernández in a 0–2 defeat against Atlante. In that match, he played the entire match. Aldrete had been a regular starter for Monarcas Morelia.

In 2012 after making nearly 200 league appearances for Morelia, it was announced that Aldrete would be transferred to América in May 2012 for the Apertura 2012 season.

Dorados (loan)
Aldrete was loaned to Dorados de Sinaloa for the Clausura 2006 season. Aldrete made his professional debut as a footballer with Dorados, he made his debut 21 January 2006 at age 17 in a game against Atlante, which ended in a 0–0 draw. During his stint in Sinaloa, Adrian made seven league appearances, scoring an own goal against Monarcas Morelia, his parent club, in a match which ended in a 3–3 draw. He had little participation with the club and returned to Morelia after six months.

América
In May 2012, Aldrete transferred to América for the Apertura 2012 season. He made his debut with the club on 21 July 2012 in a league game against Monterrey. Aldrete won his first league championship with América after defeating cross-town rivals Cruz Azul in the final via a penalty shoot-out. He played 62 minutes until being substituted by Christian Bermúdez.

Cruz Azul
On 6 June 2016, it was announced that Aldrete would join Cruz Azul for the Apertura 2016 in the Liga MX.

Pumas UNAM
On 1 July 2022, it was announced that Aldrete would join UNAM for the Apertura 2022 in the Liga MX as free agent.

International career

Youth
Aldrete was chosen by coach Jesús Ramírez to participate in the 2005 FIFA U-17 World Cup held in Peru. He played as a midfielder in the tournament rather than a defender, which was his natural position. He played the full 90 minutes in each tournament game, although he did not play in the match against Turkey. Aldrete did play the final against Brazil, beating them 3–0 and achieving for Mexico its first U-17 championship.

In 2007 Aldrete was chosen again by coach Jesús Ramírez to participate in the 2007 U-20 World Cup CONCACAF qualifying tournament, playing in all of the matches and Mexico qualified for the 2007 FIFA U-20 World Cup, which Aldrete also participated in. Mexico was eliminated in a quarter-final match against Argentina.

Aldrete participated in the 2006 Central American and Caribbean Games and was one of the youngest members on the team, being age 18. Mexico was eliminated in a quarter-final round match against Honduras.

Career statistics

Honours
Morelia
SuperLiga: 2010

América
Liga MX: Clausura 2013

Santos Laguna
Liga MX: Clausura 2015
Copa MX: Apertura 2014
Campeón de Campeones: 2015

Cruz Azul
Liga MX: Guardianes 2021
Copa MX: Apertura 2018
Supercopa MX: 2019
Leagues Cup: 2019

Mexico U17
FIFA U-17 World Championship: 2005

Individual
Liga MX Best XI: Guardianes 2020

References

External links
 
 
 

1988 births
Living people
Footballers from Guadalajara, Jalisco
Association football fullbacks
Mexican footballers
Mexico youth international footballers
Mexico under-20 international footballers
Mexico international footballers
2013 CONCACAF Gold Cup players
2015 Copa América players
Atlético Morelia players
Dorados de Sinaloa footballers
Club América footballers
Santos Laguna footballers
Cruz Azul footballers
Liga MX players